Electra Heart is the second studio album by Welsh singer Marina Diamandis, released under the stage name Marina and the Diamonds. It was released on 27 April 2012 by 679 Artists and Atlantic Records. Diamandis collaborated with producers including Liam Howe, Greg Kurstin, Dr. Luke, Diplo and Stargate during its recording, and subsequently transitioned from the new wave musical styles seen throughout her debut studio album, The Family Jewels (2010). Their efforts resulted in a concept album consisting of electropop and dance-pop music, a distinct departure from her earlier projects. Lyrically, the album discusses topics of love and identity. Diamandis created the title character "Electra Heart" to represent female archetypes in popular American culture (House Wife, Beauty Queen, Homewrecker, and Idle Teen).

Music critics were divided in their opinions of Electra Heart, expressing ambivalence towards Diamandis' shift in musical style and its overall production. However, the album retrospectively earned the status of a cult classic, with Rolling Stone listing it among the 50 greatest concept albums of all time. The album debuted at number one on the UK Albums Chart with first-week sales of 21,358 copies. In doing so, it earned Diamandis her first chart-topping album there. The album was eventually certified gold by the British Phonographic Industry (BPI) for exceeding shipments of 100,000 units. Electra Heart performed moderately on international charts, including a peak position of number 31 on the US Billboard 200, and became Diamandis' highest-charting album in the United States at the time selling an estimated 11,000 copies.

Electra Heart was supported by three singles, all of which were supplemented by music videos. "Primadonna" was released as the lead single from the album on 20 March 2012, and peaked at number 11 on the UK Singles Chart. Follow-up singles "Power & Control" and "How to Be a Heartbreaker" were respectively released on 20 July and 7 December, and reached numbers 193 and 88 in the United Kingdom. Promotional single "Radioactive" charted inside the top 40 in several countries. The album was additionally promoted by Diamandis' headlining The Lonely Hearts Club Tour, which visited Europe and North America from May 2012 through May 2013.

Background and production

After returning from the United States after the launch of her debut studio album The Family Jewels (2010), Diamandis considered creating a character which would become the centerpiece of her follow-up project. She commented that she was inspired by the "Tumblr generation" to photograph herself in several places across the United States, appearing as a different persona in each picture to mimick the anonymity of the "mini-stars of the internet". The final product became "a cold, ruthless character who wasn't vulnerable", which she later named "Electra Heart" and detailed as a tool to represent a combination of elements associated with the American Dream and Greek tragedy, and added that visuals would merge the differing concepts into a cohesive idea.

Diamandis first announced Electra Heart in August 2011; it was initially planned to become a three-piece project inspired by American culture in the 1970s, although it eventually evolved into her second studio album. Diamandis originally planned to release the record as a "side project" under an entity separate from Marina and the Diamonds, although her management disapproved. The track "Living Dead" was the first recorded during its production, and approximately 22 songs were recorded for potential inclusion on the album. 

She later commented that the record was dedicated to "dysfunctional love", elaborating that "rejection is a universally embarrassing topic and Electra Heart is my response to that." Diamandis stated that Electra Heart was influenced by Madonna, Marilyn Monroe, and Queen of France Marie Antoinette; she described Madonna as being "fearless" and felt that she showcased a desire to be a successful artist beyond fame and wealth. Diamandis told Glamour that Britney Spears influenced a "double-sided" theme for the record of both "innocence" and "darkness". She described the final product as being "a bit cringe" and reflective of her personal experiences, although noted that its promotional campaign would be "pink and fluffy".

Composition

Electra Heart is an electropop and dance-pop record with inflections of pop-punk, dubstep, rock, and Italo disco. It has been described as a concept album detailing "female identity" and "a recent breakup". It represents a musical departure from Diamandis' debut studio album The Family Jewels (2010), which incorporated a new wave and indie rock-influenced sonority. She later commented that the album was specifically designed as a pop record to allow her to establish a greater prominence in the contemporary music industry. The title character "Electra Heart" portrays four female archetypes in the album:  "Teen Idle", "Primadonna", "Homewrecker", and "Su-Barbie-A". Their presences on each track are not clearly defined, although Diamandis acknowledged that they are more apparent on the visual aspects of the album.

Alexis Petridis from The Guardian compared the lyrical content used throughout the pop punk-inspired opener "Bubblegum Bitch" to "the self-fulfilling I-will-be-huge prophecy" that was developed in The Fame by Lady Gaga. The following track "Primadonna" is a pop number that contains a "surging beat" and an "anti-chorus structure", which according to James Christopher Monger from AllMusic blends styles reminiscent of Swedish singer Lykke Li and the British band Coldplay. 

"Lies" is an electro ballad, which Michael Cragg from BBC Music felt that allowed Diamandis to "deal directly with her emotions", and opined that contributions from producer Diplo gave the song "extra gloom wobble sadness". Cragg classified "Homewrecker" as a "vampy" track which blends verses centred around spoken-word vocals with a "stompy" refrain where Diamandis declares "I broke a million hearts just for fun". Cragg further opined that "Starring Role" was "heart-rending in its simplicity", and noticed prominent piano and drum instrumentation throughout the recording.

Monger saw the sixth track "The State of Dreaming" as a solemn offering from the record for its intellectual lyrical content, which he described as one of several tracks that "reveal the lonely rebel, defiantly eating lunch alone, secretly wishing for acceptance." "Power & Control" was detailed as an electropop track by Emily Mackay from The Quietus, while Laura Snapes from Pitchfork commented that Diamandis repeatedly delivers the lyrics "I am weak" with an "increasingly ephemeral voice" as it progresses. Snapes also felt that "Living Dead" was a more "vulnerable moment" from Electra Heart, and compared it to the "snappy [and] taut" works of English duo Soft Cell. 

Monger recognised inspiration from American singer Lana Del Rey in "Teen Idle" and felt that it represented "the feral blood of an army of disenfranchised high-school loners coming into their own". Bradley Stern from MuuMuse suggested that "Valley of the Dolls" drew inspiration from the 1967 film of the same name, and described "Hypocrates" as a "sparkling guitar-pop tune" that takes stylistic influences from 1960s pop music and details the power struggle between romantic partners. Electra Heart closes with its 12th track "Fear and Loathing", which experiments with electronic music styles; Petridis made particular note of its minimal production, which according to him, places emphasis on Diamandis' "coolly enunciated and slightly folky" vocals.

Release and promotion
On 1 March, Diamandis unveiled the album artwork for the standard version of Electra Heart, which depicts a blonde Diamandis wearing several hair rollers. The singer later revealed that because of the dye, her hair started to fall out, so she got a boy's haircut and wore a wig. Becky Bain from Idolator complimented its "retro film stock look" and opined that it "is just a snapshot from some 1970s exploitation movie", while Bradley Stern from MuuMuse jokingly referenced the album track "Homewrecker" when stating that she "looks like a proper Suzy Homemaker! (Or should I say Suzy Homewrecker?)" The artwork for the deluxe version features the same picture of Diamandis, although it is tinted purple. The track listing for the standard version was confirmed on 1 March, while the track listing for the deluxe version was announced on 5 March. A limited edition box set of Electra Heart contained the deluxe version of the record, four photo art cards, a ring, perspex, necklace, and pocket mirror.

Music videos

Diamandis released 11 music videos through YouTube during the promotional campaign for Electra Heart. She claimed that their production led her record label into bankruptcy, but stated that they would be released and "finish this era the way I want to." The first, titled "Part 1: Fear and Loathing", was released on 8 August 2011, and sees Diamandis cutting her long brown hair and singing the track on a balcony during the nighttime. It was followed by "Part 2: Radioactive" on 22 August, which depicts a blonde-wigged Diamandis travelling across the United States with her romantic interest. 

The track was released through the iTunes Store on 23 September, and peaked at number 25 on the UK Singles Chart on 15 October. The black-and-white clip "Part 3: The Archetypes" shows the close-up of a blonde Diamandis while the introduction of "The State of Dreaming" is played; it introduced the archetypes "housewife", "beauty queen", "homewrecker", and "idle teen" on 15 December. "Part 4: Primadonna" served as the music video for the lead single from the record on 12 March 2012.

Uploaded on 18 May, the black-and-white "Part 5: Su-Barbie-A" is set to the introduction of "Valley of the Dolls" with overlapped commentary mentioning "Quick-Curl Barbie" and "Mod-Hair Ken"; it depicts Diamandis standing on the porch of a house with her back to the front door. It was followed by "Part 6: Power & Control" on 30 May, where Diamandis is seen engaging in a series of mind games with her romantic interest. Diamandis alleged that Atlantic Records delayed the premiere of "Part 7: How to Be a Heartbreaker" because they felt she was "ugly" in the clip; it was made publicly available on 28 September, and sees Diamandis interacting with several shirtless men in a community shower. "Part 8: E.V.O.L." introduced the previously-unreleased track "E.V.O.L" on 14 February 2013. The black-and-white visual shows a brown-wigged Diamandis looking about a room with white-tiled walls.

"Part 9: The State of Dreaming", premiered on 2 March, presents Diamandis lying on a bed while "alternating between sad eyes and a big smile". It begins with a black-and-white filter, although transitions into color after the first minute. It was followed by "Part 10: Lies" on 17 July, and employs a similar black-and-white to color technique. Diamandis is first seen looking into the camera wearing little makeup, and is later shown walking into the woods and sitting at a dinner table in the rain. The final music video "Part 11: Electra Heart" introduced the previously-unreleased title track; the clip itself contains footage from the earlier music videos. It symbolically ended the promotional era for Electra Heart, with Diamandis having tweeted "Goodbye, Electra Heart!" on 8 August, the same day the video was released.

Singles
Inspired by the six-single promotional campaign for Katy Perry's Teenage Dream (2010), Diamandis planned to release six singles from Electra Heart; however, three tracks were released before she finished promoting the album. "Primadonna" was announced as the lead single from the record on 13 March 2012, and was released through the iTunes Store in the United States on 20 March. Robert Copsey from Digital Spy spoke favourably of the track, complimenting its overall production and Diamandis' portrayal of its female archetype. It peaked at number 11 on the UK Singles Chart, becoming Diamandis' fifth song to enter the top 40 in the United Kingdom. 

"Power & Control" was released through the iTunes Store in the United Kingdom on 20 July 2012 and served as the second single from Electra Heart. It peaked at number 193 on the UK Singles Chart. In July 2012, it was announced that "How to Be a Heartbreaker" would be released as the second single in the United States and the third single in the United Kingdom. Diamandis commented that she had written the track while Electra Heart was being pressed in the United Kingdom, and consequently missed the cut-off for initial inclusion on the record; however, it was featured in the revised track listing for the American version. The song was released through the iTunes Store on 7 December 2012, and peaked at number 88 on the UK Singles Chart.

Tour

In February 2012, Diamandis announced the launch of her headlining The Lonely Hearts Club Tour. It ran alongside the Mylo Xyloto Tour headlined by Coldplay, for which Diamandis served as the supporting act. The Lonely Hearts Club Tour was initially scheduled to begin on 4 May at the Manchester Cathedral in Manchester, although it was delayed after Diamandis sustained a vocal cord injury, and ultimately began on 18 June at The Waterfront in Norwich. The American leg of the tour began on 10 July at The Fonda Theatre in Los Angeles, while the tour itself ended on 29 May 2013 after a performance at the Rumsey Playfield in New York City.

Critical reception

Electra Heart received mixed reviews from music critics. At Metacritic, which assigns a normalised rating out of 100 to reviews from mainstream publications, the album received an average score of 57, based on 16 reviews. Writing for AllMusic, James Christopher Monger compared the record to the works of American singers Kesha and Lady Gaga, and favourably summarised it as "a brooding, sexy, desperate, overwrought, and infectious record that's both aware and unashamed of its contrivance." 

Michael Cragg of BBC Music felt that the recurring concept of failed romance established "a strange dichotomy" that created a sense of cohesiveness, and elaborated that it "[pulls] you sharply into her world." He considered the second half of the disc to be mildly disappointing, although concluded that this was excusable because the overall record "[balances] the ironic and the heartfelt, the quirky and the mainstream, the real and the fake with remarkable aplomb." 

Tim Stack of Entertainment Weekly complimented Diamandis for her ability to "rival Katy Perry for catchy hooks, command with the swagger of Gwen Stefani, and even come close to the ethereal vocal exhilaration of Florence Welch." Stack opined that Electra Heart was a healthy combination of up-tempo recordings and genuinely-delivered ballads, and placed additional praise on the female archetypes explored throughout the album.

The Guardian writer Alexis Petridis was confident that "there's clearly an interesting pop star" emerging from Diamandis, but suggested that her creativity was restricted by the heavy integration of alter egos and an implied determination for commercial success, which he commented failed to reflect Diamandis' inventiveness. Simon Price from The Independent accepted that the record was "too professional to be truly terrible", although noted that Diamandis' revamped public image as a "British Katy Perry" lacked ingenuity. 

NME columnist Priya Elan summarised the album as an "expensive-sounding failure" that suffered from its lack of decisiveness. Writing for Pitchfork, Laura Snapes questioned the decision of creating the "Electra Heart" character for the record, and suggested that it was unnecessary. She elaborated that "duller and more unbearable" tracks were unavoidable, and expressed particular disappointment because she thought that Electra Heart could have become "one of the year's most acclaimed pop albums." 

Representing The Observer, Kitty Empire assumed that Diamandis' collaborations with Dr. Luke and Greg Kurstin were evidence of "a big label push". She compared the disc to the works of Perry and Britney Spears, although felt that Lana Del Rey was more successful in embodying the themes of "love, identity, femininity and America" than Diamandis' generic production values allowed. Emily Mackay from The Quietus criticised the songs' titles for being lacklustre, which she sarcastically stated caused listeners "physical pain", and was disappointed that the character "Electra Heart" was a scapegoat for expressing "all the worst parts of Marina Diamandis that she didn't want to become."

A decade after their original review, Clash reflected on their original scoring of 1/10 as "particularly unpleasant – cruel, rude, and actually pretty offensive. Yuck."

Commercial performance

Electra Heart debuted at number one on the UK Albums Chart with first-week sales of 21,358 copies. It became Diamandis' first chart-topping album in the United Kingdom, although it was additionally distinguished as the lowest-selling number-one record of the 21st century in the country. It was later surpassed by Write It on Your Skin by Newton Faulkner, which debuted at number one on the UK Albums Chart with first-week sales of 16,647 copies three months later. On 15 April 2016, Electra Heart was certified gold by the British Phonographic Industry for exceeding shipments of 100,000 units in the United Kingdom. The record additionally reached number one on both the Irish Albums Chart and the Scottish Albums Chart; it was recognised with a gold certification in the former territory by the Irish Recorded Music Association (IRMA).

Electra Heart performed moderately on additional record charts in Europe. The record peaked at number 11 on the Swiss Hitparade, and reached number 17 on the German Media Control Charts. It charted at number 25 on the Ö3 Austria Top 40, number 30 on the Norwegian VG-lista, and number 41 on the Swedish Sverigetopplistan. The album reached the lower ends of the Dutch MegaCharts and the Belgian Ultratop in Wallonia, respectively peaking at numbers 92 and 132 in each region. However, it reached number 31 on the Official New Zealand Music Chart and number 32 on the Australian ARIA Albums Chart in Oceania.

Electra Heart debuted at number 31 on the US Billboard 200, and reached number two on the Billboard Dance/Electronic Albums component chart. It had sold 150,000 copies in the United States as of May 2015. On 13 April 2019, the album was certified gold by the Recording Industry Association of America (RIAA), denoting shipments in excess of 500,000 units in the United States. Elsewhere in North America, the record peaked at number 50 on the Canadian Albums Chart. In August 2012, Diamandis commented that she believed consumers in the United Kingdom had misinterpreted her comical effort with a perceived abandonment of her original musical inspiration, thus resulting in a relative underperformance in the country. In contrast, she felt that her American audience was more receptive of Electra Heart and her evolving public image.

As of 2015, three million singles had been sold from Electra Heart.

In 2021, the album's opening track "Bubblegum Bitch"—despite never having been released as a single—experienced a resurgence on social media platform TikTok and subsequently was certified Gold in the United States.

Track listing

Notes
  signifies a co-producer
  signifies an additional drum producer
  signifies an executive producer
  signifies a remixer

Personnel
Credits adapted from the liner notes of the deluxe edition of Electra Heart.

Musicians

 Marina Diamandis – vocals ; piano 
 Rick Nowels – keyboards ; electric guitar ; piano 
 Dean Reid – drums, bass, keyboards ; electric guitar 
 Rusty Anderson – electric guitar ; bouzouki 
 Tim Pierce – electric guitar 
 Dan Chase – keyboards ; drums, bass, programming 
 Dr. Luke – all instruments, programming 
 Cirkut – all instruments, programming 
 Diplo – additional programming 
 Greg Kurstin – keyboards, programming ; piano ; guitar, bass 
 Devrim Karaoğlu – keyboards, drums, programming ; strings ; bass 
 David Campbell – string arrangements, string conducting 
 Liam Howe – santoor, Philicorda ; synthesisers ; Mellotron, telegraph key, all programming 
 The Elite – additional drum programming 
 Matt Chamberlain – drums 
 Lambrini Kaklamani – additional vocal 
 Mikkel S. Eriksen – all instruments 
 Tor Erik Hermansen – all instruments 
 DJ Chuckie – all instruments 
 Fabian Lenssen – all instruments 
 Ryan Rabin – all instruments, programming 
 Ryan McMahon – all instruments, programming

Technical

 Rick Nowels – production 
 Dean Reid – co-production, recording 
 Kieron Menzies – recording 
 Nigel Lundemo – additional engineering 
 John Ingoldsby – additional engineering 
 Trevor Yasuda – engineering assistance 
 Mark "Spike" Stent – mixing 
 Matty Green – mixing assistance 
 Dr. Luke – production 
 Cirkut – production 
 Serban Ghenea – mixing 
 Clint Gibbs – engineering 
 Jon Sher – engineering assistance 
 Irene Richter – production coordination 
 Katie Mitzell – production coordination 
 John Hanes – mix engineering 
 Tim Roberts – mix engineering assistance 
 Phil Seaford – mix engineering assistance 
 Diplo – co-production 
 Greg Kurstin – engineering ; production 
 Jesse Shatkin – additional engineering 
 Devrim Karaoğlu – production 
 Charlie Paakkari – engineering 
 Liam Howe – production; mixing 
 The Elite – additional drum production 
 Stargate – production 
 DJ Chuckie – production 
 Fabian Lenssen – production, recording, additional engineering assistance 
 Mikkel S. Eriksen – recording 
 Miles Walker – recording 
 Phil Tan – mixing 
 Damien Lewis – additional engineering assistance 
 Tim Blacksmith – executive production 
 Danny D. – executive production 
 Ryan McMahon – production, recording, engineering 
 Ryan Rabin – production, recording, engineering 
 Dan Parry – mixing

Artwork
 Casper Balslev – photography
 Big Active – layout

Charts

Weekly charts

Year-end charts

Certifications

Release history

See also
 List of number-one albums of 2012 (Ireland)
 List of UK Albums Chart number ones of the 2010s

Notes

References

External links
 Electra Heart on Diamandis' official website
 

2012 albums
679 Artists albums
Albums produced by Cirkut
Albums produced by Diplo
Albums produced by Dr. Luke
Albums produced by Greg Kurstin
Albums produced by Stargate
Atlantic Records albums
Concept albums
Elektra Records albums
Marina Diamandis albums